The call sign CJFB may represent:

CJFB Performance Award, a popular film and musical award ceremony held annually in Bangladesh
 CJFB-FM 105.5 FM, a radio station in Bolton, Ontario, Canada
 CJFB-TV channel 5, a television station in Swift Current, Saskatchewan, Canada that operated from 1957 to 2002